Luis Ávila (born 6 December 1948) is a Panamanian boxer. He competed in the men's bantamweight event at the 1972 Summer Olympics. In his opening fight, he lost to Juan Francisco Rodríguez of Spain.

References

1948 births
Living people
Panamanian male boxers
Olympic boxers of Panama
Boxers at the 1972 Summer Olympics
Place of birth missing (living people)
Bantamweight boxers
20th-century Panamanian people